Nasser Zeinalnia (born 6 September 1970) is an Iranian wrestler. He competed in the men's freestyle 48 kg at the 1988 Summer Olympics.

References

1970 births
Living people
Iranian male sport wrestlers
Olympic wrestlers of Iran
Wrestlers at the 1988 Summer Olympics
Sportspeople from Mashhad